Scratchie and similar may refer to:
 Scratchcard, a type of card with portions that can be scratched off to reveal information
 Scratchie Records, an independent record label
 Scratchy, a fictional character in the Itchy & Scratchy Show, part of The Simpsons